The following is a list of events relating to television in Ireland from 2019.

Events
2 February – The second series of Ireland's Got Talent debuts on Virgin Media One.
19 February – Launch of the timeshift channel RTÉ2+1.
8 March – 
Sarah McTernan is announced by RTÉ as the Irish representative for the Eurovision Song Contest 2019 in Tel Aviv, Israel, where she will perform the song "22".
The Friday evening edition of Virgin Media One's The 6 O'Clock Show is replaced by Xposé.
24 March – Mairead Ronan and dance partner John Nolan win the third series of Dancing with the Stars.
27 March – Virgin Media announces that its partnership with Sky's AdSmart will to go live in Ireland in the final quarter of the year.
7 April – BSD win the second series of Ireland's Got Talent.
16 May – Sarah McTernan becomes the fifth Irish act in six years to not reach the Eurovision Song Contest final, when she is among the semi-finalists who are not selected for the final.
23 June – The Sunday Independent reports that the Broadcasting Authority of Ireland has recommended that on-demand television services broadcasting in Ireland should pay a levy to do so.
25 June – Pensioners stage a protest outside the BBC studios in Belfast and Derry following the BBC's decision to end universal free UK television licenses for those aged 75 and over, a decision that will affect those living in Northern Ireland.
28 June – Veteran presenter Gay Byrne is honoured with the Ireland-US Council's Lifetime Achievement Award at a ceremony at Dublin Castle, but is unable to attend the event due to a broken wrist and chest infection.
15 August – eir Sport and Virgin Media Sport contract a deal to show Virgin Media Sport on eir Vision and eir Sport 1 on Virgin Media Ireland.
12 September – Virgin Media Sport HD launches on Sky on channel 422.
4 November – The death is announced of veteran broadcaster Gay Byrne, who presented The Late Late Show for 37 years.

Debuts
6 January – Resistance on RTÉ One (miniseries) (2019)

Changes of network affiliation

Ongoing television programmes

1960s
 RTÉ News: Nine O'Clock (1961–present)
 RTÉ News: Six One (1962–present)
 The Late Late Show (1962–present)

1970s
 The Late Late Toy Show (1975–present)
 The Sunday Game (1979–present)

1980s
 Fair City (1989–present)
 RTÉ News: One O'Clock (1989–present)

1990s
 Would You Believe (1990s–present)
 Winning Streak (1990–present)
 Prime Time (1992–present)
 Nuacht RTÉ (1995–present)
 Nuacht TG4 (1996–present)
 Ros na Rún (1996–present)
 TV3 News (1998–present)
 Ireland AM (1999–present)
 Telly Bingo (1999–present)

2000s
 Nationwide (2000–present)
 TV3 News at 5.30 (2001–present) – now known as the 5.30
 Against the Head (2003–present)
 news2day (2003–present)
 Other Voices (2003–present)
 Saturday Night with Miriam (2005–present)
 The Week in Politics (2006–present)
 At Your Service (2008–present)
 Operation Transformation (2008–present)
 3e News (2009–present)
 Dragons' Den (2009–present)
 Two Tube (2009–present)

2010s
 Jack Taylor (2010–present)
 Mrs. Brown's Boys (2011–present)
 MasterChef Ireland (2011–present)
 Today (2012–present)
 The Works (2012–present)
 Celebrity MasterChef Ireland (2013–present)
 Second Captains Live (2013–present)
 Claire Byrne Live (2015–present)
 The Restaurant (2015–present)
 Red Rock (2015–present)
 TV3 News at 8 (2015–present)
  Ploughing Live (2015–present)
 First Dates (2016–present)
 Dancing with the Stars (2017–present)
 The Tommy Tiernan Show (2017–present)
 Striking Out (2017–present)

Ending this year
4 October – Xposé (2007–2019)

Deaths
 14 March – Pat Laffan, 79, actor
June – Tom Jordan, actor (Fair City)
11 July – Brendan Grace, 68, comedian and singer (Father Ted)
14 July – Karl Shiels, 47, actor (Fair City)
23 July – Danika McGuigan, 33, actress
4 November – Gay Byrne, 85, broadcaster (The Late Late Show'')

See also
2019 in Ireland

References